Sosonki is a rural locality in Prilepsky Selsoviet Rural Settlement, Konyshyovsky District, Kursk Oblast, Russia. Population:

Geography 
The village is located on the Platavka River (a left tributary of the Svapa River), 60.5 km from the Russia–Ukraine border, 64 km north-west of Kursk, 5 km north of the district center – the urban-type settlement Konyshyovka, 4 km from the selsoviet center – Prilepy.

 Climate
Sosonki has a warm-summer humid continental climate (Dfb in the Köppen climate classification).

Transport 
Sosonki is located 42 km from the federal route  Crimea Highway, 55 km from the route  Ukraine Highway, 36 km from the route  (Trosna – M3 highway), 20 km from the road of regional importance  (Fatezh – Dmitriyev), 2 km from the road  (Konyshyovka – Zhigayevo – 38K-038), 2 km from the nearest railway halt 552 km (railway line Navlya – Lgov-Kiyevsky).

The rural locality is situated 70 km from Kursk Vostochny Airport, 164 km from Belgorod International Airport and 272 km from Voronezh Peter the Great Airport.

References

Notes

Sources

Rural localities in Konyshyovsky District